Mattia Fallani (born 31 March 2001) is an Italian footballer who plays as a goalkeeper for  club Recanatese.

Club career

Youth club 
Raised in Fiorentina first and in SPAL after, he never made his debut in the first team.

Palermo 
On 9 August 2019, he joined Palermo, on loan.
He made his debut with rosanero jersey on 11 September 2019, as a starter, in the Preliminary Round match of the Coppa Italia Serie D, lost 5-3 on penalties against Biancavilla. He concludes his only season with the rosanero, totaling 4 appearances between league and cup.

Grosseto
On 13 August 2021, he signed with Grosseto.

Recanatese
In July 2022, he moved to Recanatese.

Career statistics

Club

References

2001 births
Living people
Footballers from Florence
Italian footballers
Association football goalkeepers
Serie C players
Serie D players
ACF Fiorentina players
S.P.A.L. players
Palermo F.C. players
U.S. Grosseto 1912 players
U.S.D. Recanatese 1923 players